T8 or T-8 may refer to the following:

Measurement
 T8, a Torx screwhead size
 T8, a 1 inch fluorescent lamp size
 A tornado intensity rating on the TORRO scale

Biology
 The 8th thoracic vertebra
 The T8 spinal nerve

Transportation
 Trikke8, a scooter-like vehicle
 An OS T1000 train class model, used on the Oslo Metro
 Airport & South Line, a rail service in Sydney numbered T8
 Île-de-France tramway Line 8, one of the Tramways in Île-de-France

Other
 One of the Hong Kong Tropical Cyclone Warning Signals used by the Hong Kong Observatory
 Tekken 8, an upcoming fighting game
 The International Telecommunication Union prefix for Palau
 YouTube Channel based on The Lion King

See also
8T (disambiguation)